The Palmerston Forts along the north bank of the Thames River and East Anglia include:

Beacon Hill Battery, Harwich   
Coalhouse Fort, East Tilbury
East Tilbury Battery, East Tilbury
Landguard Fort, Felixstowe

East Anglia